Nancy Drew is a 2002 American television film directed by James Frawley and written by Ami Canaan Mann. It stars Maggie Lawson as teen sleuth Nancy Drew, who heads off to college and finds yet another mystery to solve. The film first aired on December 15, 2002, on ABC.

Plot
Nancy Drew begins college with her two best friends, Bess Marvin and George Fayne, at River Heights University. After the star football player goes into a coma, Nancy investigates, finding a campus-wide conspiracy and a fraternity's drug use.

Cast
 Maggie Lawson as Nancy Drew
 Jill Ritchie as Bess Marvin
 Lauren Birkell as George Fayne
 Marieh Delfino as Christina "Teeny" Timkins
 Charlie Finn as Hank Luckman
 Heath Freeman as Det. Patrick Daly
 James Avery as Prof. Duke Shifflin
 Brett Cullen as Carson Drew
 Jenny O'Hara as Hannah Gruen
 Nick Stabile as Ned Nickerson
 Brian White as Franklin "Sweet Money" Sanderson
 Kevin Tighe as Coach Jeffries
 Sabine Singh as Allison Price
 Michelle Morgan as Jaclyn Calberson
 Dale Midkiff as Jimbo Mitchell
 Hoku as Bitsy
 Joanna Canton as Sue

Production
The pilot was ordered by ABC in January 2002, in contention for the 2002-03 television season. Production for the pilot began in Los Angeles on March 11, and was finished within the month. In May, ABC announced it wouldn't include Nancy Drew on the fall 2002 schedule, instead deciding to air it as a part of The Wonderful World of Walt Disney, to see how it would do for a possible mid-season replacement. In anticipation of a pickup, ABC ordered six additional scripts, and put the actors under contract for a Spring 2003 premiere. Despite this, ABC decided in January 2003 to not pick it up.

Lawson was the first to be cast in early February 2002. Actresses Christine Lakin and Rachel McAdams also auditioned for the title role. The pilot was the first audition for McAdams, who later stated losing the role helped get her a leading role in The Hot Chick. Ritchie, Birkell, Delfino, Finn, Freeman, and Cullen were all cast in late February, while Avery was not cast until March. The film was dedicated to the original author of the Nancy Drew books, Mildred Wirt Benson. Wirt ghostwrote the series under the pseudonym Carolyn Keene, from 1930 to 1953; she wrote 23 of the first 30 Nancy Drew books. Wirt had died in May 2002.

The songs "Analyze", "Fade into You", and "I Tried to Rock You But You Only Roll" were used in the film.

Broadcast
Originally scheduled to air Sunday, October 20, 2002, the film aired on ABC on Sunday, December 15, 2002, as a part of The Wonderful World of Disney. It was watched by 7.5 million people, placing in third for its time slot.

Reception

Laura Fries, of Variety, states, "Nancy Drew is off her game. The plucky heroine from the books of Mildred Wirt Benson, aka Caroline Keene, just doesn't have the same relevance she once did, and while ABC's updated version for the Wonderful World of Disney is a slick, earnest effort, it's way out of place."

Nancy Drew was nominated for a 2003 Prism Award in the category "Movie or Miniseries for Television."

References

External links 
 
 Official page on ABC website (Archived)

Films based on Nancy Drew
2002 television films
2002 films
American television films
2000s English-language films
American detective films
Television films as pilots
Television pilots not picked up as a series
Films directed by James Frawley
2000s American films